Ten O'Clock Classics (TOC) is an American group of classical musicians established in 2000. Its founder and current artistic director, Ronen (Ronnie) Segev, was educated at the High School for Performing Visual Arts (HSPVA) in Houston, Texas before moving to Juilliard, where he studied under classical pianist and professor of music Veda Kaplinsky.

Ten O'Clock Classics have performed in venues throughout the world, including Cortot Hall in Paris and the Melbourne International Arts Festival. TOC's outreach concerts include performances at Studio 54, Gotham Properties, Crunch Fitness, The Knitting Factory, The Cutting Room, MAKOR, Le Cirque, and Union Square Ballroom.

The group's educational initiatives include providing weekly private music lessons and instruments free of charge to New York City schoolchildren, and performances and lectures at schools throughout the United States.

In April 2009, Billy Joel, one of the group's board members, auctioned off an autographed Steinway piano to raise funds for the education component of the program. In September 2009, Justin Timberlake made a donation.

References

External links 

 

American classical music groups
High School for the Performing and Visual Arts alumni